These are the partial results of the athletics competition at the 1951 Mediterranean Games taking place between 6 and 10 October in Alexandria, Greece.

Results

100 meters
Heats – 6 October

Semifinals

Final

200 meters
Heats – 8 October

Semifinals – 9 October

Final – 10 October

400 meters
Heats – 6 October

Final – 8 October

800 meters
Heats – 6 October

Final – 9 October

1500 meters
10 October

5000 meters
9 October

10,000 meters
8 October

Marathon
10 October

110 meters hurdles
Heats – 6 October

Final – 7 October

400 meters hurdles
Heats – 7 October

Final – 8 October

3000 meters steeplechase
10 October

4 × 100 meters relay
9 October

4 × 400 meters relay
10 October

10 kilometers walk

High jump
10 October

Pole vault
9 October

Long jump
8 October

Triple jump

Shot put
8 October

Discus throw
9 October

Hammer throw

Javelin throw
10 October

Decathlon
7–8 October

References

Mediterranean Games
1951